Kemp is an unincorporated community in Douglas County, Illinois, in the eastern part of the state. Situated 153 miles south of Chicago and (approximately) 13 miles north of Charleston, it has a population of (approximately) 55 people.

External links
NACo

Unincorporated communities in Douglas County, Illinois
Unincorporated communities in Illinois